Norman Antony Francis St John-Stevas, Baron St John of Fawsley,  (born Norman Panayea St John Stevas; 18 May 1929 – 2 March 2012) was a British Conservative politician, author and barrister. He served as Leader of the House of Commons in the government of Prime Minister Margaret Thatcher from 1979 to 1981. He was Member of Parliament (MP) for Chelmsford from 1964 to 1987, and was made a life peer in 1987. His surname was created by compounding those of his father (Stevas) and mother (St John-O'Connor).

Early life
Stevas was born in London. His birth certificate specified that his Christian names were Norman Panayea St John, and that his father was Spyro Stevas, a hotel proprietor of Greek origin. His Who's Who entry specified that his father was Stephen Stevas, an engineer and company director. His mother was Kitty St John O'Connor. His parents divorced, whereupon his mother hyphenated the name St John. He was reputedly closer to his mother than to his father. His older sister was the actress Juno Alexander, first wife of actor Terence Alexander.

Stevas was educated at St Joseph's Salesian School, Burwash, East Sussex, and then at the Catholic school, Ratcliffe College, Leicester. He was active in the Young Conservatives as a speaker for Conservative and Catholic causes. He was a contemporary of Gordon Reece, whom he reported to his superiors for atheism.

Subsequently, he was for six months enrolled at the English College, Rome, a seminary for the Roman Catholic priesthood, but found that he had no vocation. He remained a Catholic throughout his life, however. He then read law at what was then Fitzwilliam Hall, now Fitzwilliam College, Cambridge. As an undergraduate, he lived at St Edmund's House (now St Edmund's College, which at the time was a predominantly Roman Catholic institution) and served as President of the Cambridge Union in 1950. He graduated with first class honours and won the Whitlock Prize.

He studied also at Oxford University, where he gained a Second in the examination for the BCL degree at Christ Church and was the Secretary of the Oxford Union. He obtained a PhD degree with thesis titled A study of censorship with special reference to the law governing obscene publications in common law and other jurisdictions (on the early work of Walter Bagehot) from the University of London and a JSD degree from Yale University. He was called to the Bar at the Middle Temple in 1952.

Academic and legal career
St John-Stevas was appointed as a lecturer at Southampton University (1952–1953) and King's College London (1953–1956). He then went to Oxford University to tutor in Jurisprudence at Christ Church (1953–1955) and Merton College (1955–1957). He also lectured in the United States and held a visiting professorship at the University of California, Santa Barbara. From 1954 to 1959 he was legal adviser to Sir Alan Herbert's Committee on book censorship.

Stevas also won many prizes and scholarships: the Blackstone and Harmsworth Scholarship (1952); the Blackstone Prize (1953); The Yorke Prize of Cambridge University (1957); a fellowship at Yale Law School (1958); a Fulbright award; and a Fund for the Republic fellowship (1958).

In 1956 his book Obscenity and the Law was published. This "became a key work of reference during subsequent reforms" and also "reflected an intellectual shift toward the law's retreat from the pulpit". He also wrote Life, Death and the Law (1961), The Right to Life (1963) and The Law and Morals (1964). These were "earnest...with a liberal Catholic lawyer addressing difficult questions in a thoughtful spirit".

In 1959, he joined The Economist and became its Legal and Political Correspondent. Stevas edited the collected works of the Victorian journalist and politician Walter Bagehot. Between 1965 and 1986, The Economist itself published his edition "to great acclaim", what have been called fifteen "beautifully produced and highly regarded volumes". These volumes have been labelled Stevas's "memorial".

Politician
A founding member of the Conservative Bow Group, in 1951 St John-Stevas stood unsuccessfully for the safe Labour seat of Dagenham. He was later elected as Member of Parliament for the safe Conservative seat of Chelmsford in Essex at the 1964 general election holding this seat until stepping down at the 1987 general election. In later elections, the seat became marginal, and his majority at his final election contest in 1983 was less than a thousand votes.

He had opposed Sir Anthony Eden's invasion of Suez in 1956, was a long-standing opponent of capital punishment and immigration restrictions based on race, and favoured a relaxation of the obscenity laws. Owing to his Catholic views, he opposed Leo Abse's Divorce Bill and David Steel's Abortion Bill. In 1966, he was a co-sponsor of Abse's private member's bill to reform the law to permit homosexual acts between consenting adults, which became the Sexual Offences Act 1967.

In the later stages of Prime Minister Edward Heath's government, St John-Stevas was Parliamentary Under Secretary of State at the Department of Education and Science (where Margaret Thatcher was the Secretary of State), and the Minister for the Arts (1973–1974).

After the defeat of Heath's government, St John-Stevas supported Heath in the first ballot of the 1975 Conservative Party leadership election but switched his vote to Thatcher in the second ballot. He then served as a member of the Shadow Cabinet from 1974 to 1979, being the Shadow Spokesman for Education between 1975 and 1978. His deputy was Sir Rhodes Boyson, a working-class Thatcherite from Lancashire. Stevas and Boyson did not get along and loathed each other. Stevas gave Boyson the ironic nickname "Colossus". He became Shadow Leader of the House of Commons in 1978. When the Conservative Party was returned to power at the 1979 general election, he was appointed as Minister for the Arts for a second time from 1979 to 1981, while simultaneously holding the roles of Leader of the House of Commons and Chancellor of the Duchy of Lancaster.

In his role as Leader of the House, he has been credited with the creation of the House of Commons' system of select committees. These committees enable backbench MPs to hold ministers to account, and exert considerable influence within Parliament. In January 1981, St John-Stevas was the first of the Tory "wets" to be dismissed from the Cabinet by Margaret Thatcher (whom he had previously nicknamed "Tina" for her "there is no alternative" rhetoric). Thatcher explained to Roy Strong, "Norman was too much", and added, "Look at the way he'd done his office up. No sense of economy".

Now on the back-benches, Stevas remained loyal to Thatcher whilst criticising Thatcherite economic policies: "He was a One Nation Conservative who looked to Disraeli rather than Milton Friedman". In 1984 appeared his book The Two Cities, in which he said that Thatcher could see "everything in black and white [but] the universe I inhabit is made up of many shades of grey". He continued his interest in Parliamentary accountability, in 1983, he won the ballot for private members' bills and brought in the bill which became the National Audit Act 1983 establishing the UK's National Audit Office and making it clear that the Comptroller and Auditor General, its head, was an officer of the House of Commons with rights to inspect the value for money of government spending.

St John-Stevas stood down from the House of Commons at the 1987 general election, being created a life peer in the House of Lords with the title Baron St John of Fawsley of Preston Capes in the County of Northamptonshire on 19 October 1987.

Chairman of the Royal Fine Art Commission
He was Chairman of the Royal Fine Art Commission from 1985 to 1999. His tenure was wracked by controversy. It was hoped that his appointment would revitalise and popularise the commission, which had not even produced an annual report for many years. Stevas succeeded in "inject[ing] a bit of panache and excitement" into the commission. However it also became a mouthpiece for Lord St John's own views and preferences (most prominently in the annual Building of the Year award). Lord St John adorned his office with paintings from national collections, documents were presented in red boxes and he was served by a chauffeur and ex-civil servants, in accommodation more lavish than that of most secretaries of state: prompting one commentator to quip that "if he cannot have power, he must have the trappings". The necessity of such extravagance was questioned in a government report by Sir Geoffrey Chipperfield.

The Commission strongly criticised the plans for the Millennium Wheel on London's South Bank even though three of the Commissioners were enthusiastic about it. After an ill-tempered meeting in which Stevas was allegedly rude to the Wheel's architects, Sherban Cantacuzino, the commission's secretary, wrote to the architects saying: "I am sure that he enjoys putting people down, all of us have suffered from his bullying".

Despite all predictions, in 1995 Stevas was reappointed for a third term as chairman.

Master of Emmanuel College, Cambridge
His tenure as Master of Emmanuel College at Cambridge University (1991 to 1996) was at times controversial. He built a new lecture theatre with ancillary rooms (the Queen's Building) at the cost of some £8 million, the costs of which were pushed upwards by Lord St John's insistence on re-opening the quarries in Ketton, Rutland, to obtain limestone from the same source from which the college's Wren chapel was built. Some of the college's fellows apparently first had doubts about the wisdom of appointing Stevas when several of his friends were caught naked one night in the Fellows' Garden swimming pool.

Stevas succeeded in promoting the college through House and Garden and Hello!, although some fellows were angered when Mohammed al-Fayed, who had donated £250,000 to a new extension of the college, was rewarded with a "Harrods Room" and an honorary membership of the college, an honour Stevas invented. The relationship between Master and College worsened to the point that "one tutor started handing out copies of the Master's pronouncements in his role as 'constitutional expert' with a prize for the student who spotted the greatest number of legal mistakes".

Stevas's critics alleged that he spent too much time with a small clique of public school-educated young men who "were favoured with introductions to royalty and captains of industry, to dinners at White's, private theatrical performances at the Master's Lodge and long, affectionate letters". Stevas would also cut undergraduates off in mid-sentence with a cutting remark in Latin and to members of other colleges Emmanuel gained the nickname "Mein Camp".

After his retirement as Master he maintained his ties with Emmanuel College, which he used from time to time as a venue for events of the Royal Fine Art Commission Trust.

Personal life
Lord St John was a prominent Roman Catholic.  He was also Patron of the Anglican Society of King Charles the Martyr, and Grand Bailiff for England and Wales of the Military and Hospitaller Order of Saint Lazarus (statuted 1910).

He was chairman of the Catholic New Bearings group in the early 1970s whose members included the Bishop Augustine Harris.  New Bearings purpose was to provide support to priests and nuns who were struggling with their vocation and operated independently from the church.

His partner of over fifty years was Adrian Stanford. They met in 1956 at Oxford, where Lord St John taught Stanford law. They entered into a civil partnership shortly before Lord St John's death enabling only the latter to face inheritance tax when he dies. Without this 40% on £3.3 million would be instantly liable to tax but lessened by any agricultural, active own business and charity bequests, which are not published in the public calendars of probate.

He was noted for his many personal affectations, including proffering his hand in papal fashion, lapsing into Latin whilst speaking, and deliberately mispronouncing modern words. A loyal monarchist, Lord St John enjoyed a close relationship with the British Royal Family. Soon after his elevation to the Lords, photographs of him in purple bedroom slippers appeared in Hello! magazine while he lounged in the bedroom of his former rectory home in Northampton with a signed photograph of Princess Margaret prominently displayed. All personal notes were written in purple ink. After his elevation to the Lords he was an active member and used only official House of Lords headed stationery. He lived in Montpellier Square, Knightsbridge, and had a house in Northamptonshire.The Catholic Herald, a newspaper that St John-Stevas had contributed to on many occasions, wrote on his death that 'Unlike a lot of people who have trodden the corridors of power, he was not in the least secretive about his experiences. He idolised the Queen Mother, Princess Margaret and Pius IX. His house in Northamptonshire was filled with relics and pictures of all three. He even had a cassock which was supposed to have belonged to the Blessed Pius, and ... on occasions he wore it to fancy dress parties'.

He died at his home in London on 2 March 2012, aged 82, after a short illness. His homosexuality was summarised by Simon Hoggart in The Guardian obituary note: "He lived in that period where gay politicians never came "out", yet were happy for everyone to know. He lived life as a camp performance."

Distinctions
 Grand Bailiff for England and Wales of the Order of Saint Lazarus (statuted 1910)
 Fellow of the Royal Society of Literature

Arms

Bibliography
By Norman St John StevasBefore the Sunset Fades: An Autobiography, Harper Collins (2009)The Two Cities, Faber & Faber, London (1984)Pope John-Paul II: His Travels and Mission, Faber & Faber, London (1982)Agonising Choice: Birth Control, Religion and Law, Eyre & Spottiswoode, London (1971)Bagehot's Historical Essays, New York University Press (1966)Law and Morals, Hawthorn Books, New York (1964)The Right to Life, Holt, Rinehart & Winston (1963)Life, Death and the Law, Indiana University Press (1961)Walter Bagehot A study of his life & thought together with a selection from his political writings, Indiana University Press (1959)

Edited by Norman St John Stevas
Bagehot, Walter, St John Stevas, Norman (Editor): The Collected Works of Walter Bagehot: Volumes 1–15, The Economist/ Harvard University Press (1965–1986)

References

Sources
Dennis Kavanagh, 'Lord St-John of Fawsley: Flamboyant politician who fell foul of Margaret Thatcher', The Independent'', 6 March 2012.

External links

|-

|-

|-

|-

|-

1929 births
2012 deaths
20th-century English male writers
20th-century English non-fiction writers
21st-century English male writers
21st-century English non-fiction writers
Academics of King's College London
Academics of the University of Southampton
Alumni of Fitzwilliam College, Cambridge
Chancellors of the Duchy of Lancaster
Conservative Party (UK) MPs for English constituencies
Conservative Party (UK) life peers
English Roman Catholics
English gay writers
English male non-fiction writers
English people of Irish descent 
Fellows of the Royal Society of Literature
LGBT Roman Catholics
LGBT conservatism
LGBT life peers
LGBT members of the Parliament of the United Kingdom
LGBT memoirists
English LGBT politicians
Leaders of the House of Commons of the United Kingdom
Masters of Emmanuel College, Cambridge
Members of the Bow Group
Members of the Middle Temple
Members of the Privy Council of the United Kingdom
People educated at Ratcliffe College
Presidents of the Cambridge Union
UK MPs 1964–1966
UK MPs 1966–1970
UK MPs 1970–1974
UK MPs 1974
UK MPs 1974–1979
UK MPs 1979–1983
UK MPs 1983–1987
Life peers created by Elizabeth II